Chabuata is a genus of moths of the family Noctuidae.

Species
This genus presently contains 2 species:
Chabuata amoeba Hampson, 1905 (from Kenya)
Chabuata rufilinea Hampson, 1910 (from Zambia)

References

Natural History Museum Lepidoptera genus database

Hadeninae
Noctuoidea genera